The following is a list of youth organizations. A youth organization is a type of organization with a focus upon providing activities and socialization for minors. In this list, most organizations are international unless noted otherwise.

0–9 

 4-H (Worldwide)

A 

 AEGEE (Europe)
 AIESEC
 Air Training Corps (UK)
 A.J.E.F (LatAm)
 All India Youth Federation - AIYF (India)
 Akhil Bharatiya Vidyarthi Parishad (India)
 Aleph Zadik Aleph
 American Youth Congress (US)
 American Youth Hostels (US)
 Amigos de las Americas
 Anjuman Talaba-e-Islam (Pakistan)
 Armenian Youth Federation
 Army Cadet Force (UK)
 Arran (CAT)
 Arsalyn Program (US)
 Article 12 (England)
 Ateitis (Lithuania)
 All Assam Students Union (Assam, India)
 All India Muslim Students Federation (India)
 All-Polish Youth (Poland)
 Associazione Guide e Scout Cattolici Italiani (IT)

B 

 Bangladesh-China Youth Student Association
 BBYO
 Betar
 Bharat Scouts and Guides (India)
 Bharatiya Janata Yuva Morcha (India)
 Big Brothers Big Sisters of America (US)
 Bnei Akiva
 Boys' Brigade
 Boy Scouts of America (US)
 Boy Scouts of the Philippines (Philippines)
 The Boys & Girls Aid Society (US)
 Boys and Girls Clubs of America (US)
 Boys & Girls Clubs of Canada (Canada)
 British Columbia Youth Parliament (Canada)
 BUNDjugend (Germany)
 Bus Project (US)
 Bangladesh Islami Chhatra Shibir (Bangladesh)

C 

 Canadian Cadet Organizations (Canada) (*see Royal Canadian Army-Air-Sea Cadets below)
 Camp Fire (US)
 Campus Front of India (India)
 Canadian Young Judaea (Canada)
 Centre for the Talented Youth of Ireland (Ireland)
 Children and Youth International (Europe)
 Children of the American Revolution (US)
 China Youth Corps (Taiwan)
 Chiro (Belgium, Philippines)
 Christian Democratic Youth Appeal (Netherlands)
 Christian Democratic Youth League (Sweden) (Sweden)
 Christian Service Brigade (US/Canada)
 Church Lads' and Church Girls' Brigade
 CISV International
 City Year (US)
 Civil Air Patrol (US)
 CJD (Germany)
 Communist Youth Movement (Netherlands)
 Company of Young Canadians Historical
 Confédération Européenne de Scoutisme (Europe)
 Congress of South African Students
 Coptic Orphans (Egypt)
 CrossRoads Ministry (US)
 CVJM (Germany)

D 

 DeMolay International
 Democratic Youth Federation of India
 DECA formerly known as Distributive Education Clubs of America
 Duterte Youth

E 

 Eurodesk (Europe)
 Electrical Engineering Students' European Association (Europe)
 European Confederation of Young Entrepreneurs (Europe)
 Erasmus Student Network (Europe)
 European Free Alliance Youth (Europe)
 European Geology Students Network
 European Geography Association
 European Horizons (USA)
 The European Law Students' Association (Europe)
 European Scout Federation (British Association) (UK)
 European Students of Industrial Engineering and Management (Europe)
 European Youth Forum (Europe)
 European Youth Parliament (Europe)
 Euzko Gaztedi (Spain/Europe)
 Ezra USA
 Emirates Foundation (UAE)

F 

 Federal Association of Liberal Students Groups (Germany)
 FBLA (USA)
 FFA (Future Farmers of America) (USA) 
 Fimcap (Global)
 First Priority (US)
 The First Tee (US)
 For Inspiration and Recognition of Science and Technology (FIRST) (Global)
 Foras na Gaeilge (Ireland)
 Foróige (Ireland)
 Friends of Nature (Global)
 FZY (UK)

G 

 G&Y (UK)
 German Federal Association of Young Entrepreneurs (Germany)
 German Scout Movement (Germany)
 German Foundation for World Population (Deutsche Stiftung Weltbevoelkerung, DSW) (Germany)
 German Youth Movement (Germany)
 Girlguiding (UK)
 Girls' Brigade
 Girls Inc. (US)
 Girl Scouts of the USA
 Girl Guides of Canada
 Girl Scouts of the Philippines
 Global Vision (Canada)
 Global Youth Action Network
 Green Youth (Germany)
 Gopali Youth Welfare Society (India)

H 

 Habonim Dror
 Habonim Dror Australia
 Hitler Youth (Nazi Germany)
 HaNoar HaOved VeHaLomed (Israel)
 Hakfar Hayarok (Israel)
 Hashomer Hatzair
 Hebrew Scouts Movement in Israel
 High School Democrats of America (United States)
 Hineni (Australia)
 Hip Hop 4 Life (US)
 HOSA-Future Health Professionals (USA)
 Ho Chi Minh Communist Youth Union (Vietnam)
 Hugh O'Brian Youth Leadership Foundation

I 

 IAESTE
 Islami Jamiat-e-Talaba Pakistan
 Improved Order of Red Men (US)
 IIMUN
 Indian Catholic Youth Movement(India)
 Interact
 International Federation of Medical Students' Associations
 International Islamic Federation of Student Organizations
 Indian Youth Congress (India)
 International Young Democrat Union
 International Lesbian, Gay, Bisexual, Transgender and Queer Youth and Student Organisation
 International Order of the Rainbow for Girls
 International Pharmaceutical Students' Federation
 International Student/Young Pugwash
 International Federation of Liberal Youth
 International Union of Socialist Youth
 International Youth Rights
 Israel Gay Youth
 Italian Youth of the Lictor (Fascist Italy)

J 

 Junior Reserve Officer Training Corps (US)
 JCNetwork (Germany)
 Jonge Democraten (Netherlands)
 Jesus Freaks
 Jesus Youth (India)
 Jewish Lads' and Girls' Brigade (UK)
 Job's Daughters International (Worldwide)
 Junge Liberale (Germany)
 Junge Piraten (Germany)
 Junge Union (Germany)
 Junior firefighter (Global)
 Junior Forest Wardens (Canada)
 Young Socialists (Netherlands)
 Junior Achievement (US)
 Junior Chamber International
 Junior Optimist Octagon International
 Junior State of America (US)
 Jusos (Germany)

K 

 Kabataan (Philippines) ( youth)
 Key Club
 Kids for Peace
 Kids Helping Kids
 Kids Off The Block

L 

 La Forja (CAT)
 Left Youth Solid (Germany)
 Liberal Youth of Sweden (Sweden)
 Leo clubs
 Los Angeles Maritime Institute (US)
 Little League Baseball

M 

 Magshimey Herut
 Motivate Canada (Canada)
 Make A Difference (India)
 Muslim Student Union of the University of California, Irvine (US)
 Muslim Students Society of Nigeria
 Muslim Students Federation (I. U. M. L.) (India)
 Muslim Students Federation (Kerala unit) (India)
 Muslim Students Association of South Africa (South Africa)
 Muslim Students' Association (Indonesia) (Indonesia)
 Muslim Students Association (US/CANADA)
 Mocidade Portuguesa (Portugal)

N 

 National Cadet Corps India
 National Cadet Corps (Singapore)
 National Civil Defence Cadet Corps (Singapore)
 National Commission on Resources for Youth
 National Council For Voluntary Youth Services (UK)
 National Federation of Young Farmers' Clubs (UK)
 National FFA Organization (US)
 National Junior Classical League (US)
 National Police Cadet Corps (Singapore)
 National Students Union of India (NSUI)
 National Youth Administration
 National Youth Leadership Council (US)
 National Youth Organisation (disambiguation) (several)
 National Youth Rights Association (US)
 NCSY
 Netzer Olami
 The Newsboys Strike Historical
 Nexus Global Youth Summit
 Noam
 North American Federation of Temple Youth (US)
 Northern Ireland Youth Forum (NI)
 Not Back to School Camp (US)

O 

 Oaktree (foundation) (Australia)
 Opera Nazionale Balilla (Fascist Italy)
 Ógra Fianna Fáil (Ireland)
 Ógra Shinn Féin (Ireland)
 One World Youth Project
 oikos International
 Ontario Youth Parliament (Canada)
 Order of the Arrow (US)
 Organisational Forum of Economical Congress OFW (Germany)
 Our Time (US)

P 

 Parlement Jeunesse du Québec (Canada)
 Pathfinders (Seventh-day Adventist)
 PDMU (Mexico)
 Peacefire (US)
 PerspectieF (Netherlands)
 PETO (Germany)
 PINK! (Netherlands)
 Pioneer Movement (Communist countries)
 Plant-for-the-Planet
 Polish YMCA (Poland)
 Pony Club
 Privrednik Junior (Croatia)
 Progressive Youth Federation of India
 Project Q (Milwaukee)
 Puerto Rico Statehood Students Association (US)
 Peace Train (Bangladesh)

R 

 Rajiv Gandhi National Institute of Youth Development (India)
 International Order of the Rainbow for Girls (Worldwide)
 Raleigh International (UK)
 Rawhide Boys Ranch (US)
 The Rebelution (US)
 Red Cross Youth (Singapore)
 Resistance (YBNP) (UK)
 Revolutionary Youth Association (India)
 Revolutionary Youth Union (Syria)
 Republican Youth of Catalonia (Catalan Countries)
 RISKA – Remaja Islam Sunda Kelapa (Indonesia)
 Rock and Roll Camp for Girls (US)
 ROOD (Netherlands)
 Roosevelt Institution (US)
 Rotaract
 Royal Canadian Air Cadets (Canada)
 Royal Canadian Army Cadets (Canada)
 Royal Canadian Sea Cadets (Canada)
 Royal Rangers
 RSY-Netzer (UK)
 Russian Social-Democratic Union of Youth (Russia)

S 

 Sangguniang Kabataan (Philippines)
 Sandinista Youth 
(Nicaragua)
 Sano Sansar Initiative (Nepal)
 Saskatchewan Youth Parliament (Canada)
 School Strike for Climate (global)
 Scouting
 Boy Scouts
 Brownie (Girl Guides)
 Cub Scouts
 Explorer Scouts
 Girl Guiding and Girl Scouting
 Navigators (US and UK)
 Rover Scouts
 Venture Scouts
 SDLP Youth (NI)
 Secular Student Alliance (US)
 Serb Democratic Forum-Youth Forum (Croatia)
 SGPJ (Netherlands)
 Socialist Youth (disambiguation) (several)
 Socialist Youth Front (Denmark)
 Socialist Youth of Germany – Falcons (Germany)
 Solidarity Youth Movement, Kerala (India)
 South African Students Congress 
 SPIC MACAY
 SpiralScouts (US)
 St John Ambulance Australia Cadets (Australia)
 St John Ambulance Cadets in the UK (UK)
 St John Youth New Zealand
 Street Kids International (Canada/US)
 Strong Women Strong Girls (US)
 Student Catholic Action (Philippines)
 Student Union of Latvia
 Students' Union of Obafemi Awolowo University
 Students' Union of Rajiv Gandhi Government Polytechnic (SURGGP), Itanagar
 Student Edge
 Students Union of Bhutan
 Students Union of Namibia
 Studentenverbindung (Germany)
 Students' Union (Turkey)
 Students' Union UCL (formerly University College London Union)
 Students for a Free Tibet
 Student Union of the University of Helsinki
 Student Union of Tampere University (Finland)
 Student Union in Sundsvall (Sweden)
 Student Nonviolent Coordinating Committee
 Student Pugwash USA (US)
 Students for a Democratic Society (1960 organization) (US)
 Student Union (Valdosta State University) (US)
 Student Union AKKU (Netherlands)
 Students For Liberty (US-based International organization)
 Students for a Democratic Society (2006 organization) (US)
 Students' Federation of India (India)
 Students Islamic Organisation of India (India)
 Students for Sensible Drug Policy (US)
 SustainUS (US)
 Sharp Greens (Poland)

T 

 Taking Children Seriously (UK)
 TakingITGlobal
 Teenage Republicans (US)
 Teen Mania Ministries (US)
 Teen Talking Circles
 The Second Mile (US)
 The Trevor Project (US)
 The Youth Cafe (Kenya, Africa)
 Trips for Kids (US, Canada, Israel)
 TUXIS Parliament of Alberta (Canada)
 Tzivos Hashem

U 

 UK Youth Climate Coalition (UK)
 UK Youth Parliament (UK)
 United Synagogue Youth
 Up with People (US)
 Urban Saints (UK)
 UthMag (United Arab Emirates)
 Urdd Gobaith Cymru (Wales)

V 

 4T – Vietnam Youth Education Support Center  (Vietnam)
 Vietnamese Scout Association

W 

 WE Charity (Kenya, Sri Lanka, India, Ecuador, Sierra Leone, China)
 Western Canada Youth Parliament (Canada)
 Wesley Guild (Ghana, South Africa, Botswana, Namibia, United Kingdom, Nigeria, Sierra Leone, Swaziland and Lesotho)
 White Stag Leadership Development Program (US)
 Winds Across the Bay (US)
 The Woodcraft Folk (UK)
 World Assembly of Youth
 World Assembly of Muslim Youth
 World Association of Young Scientists
 World Association of Girl Guides and Girl Scouts
 World Esperanto Youth Organization
 World Federation of Democratic Youth
 World Organisation of Students and Youth
 World Organization of the Scout Movement
 World Scout Committee

Y 

 Young Australia League (AUS)
 Youth Parliament (BAN)
 Young Americans for Freedom (US)
 Young BNP (UK)
 Youth Bank (international)
 Young Communist League USA  (US)
 Young Conservatives (UK)
 Young Democratic Socialists of America (US)
 Young Democrats (Giovani Democratici) (Italy)
 Young Democrats of America (US)
 Young European Federalists (Europe)
 Young European Leadership (Europe)
 Young Judaea
 Young Life (US)
 Young Marines (US)
 Young Muslims Canada
 Young People's Socialist League (1907) (US)
 Young People's Socialist League (Socialist Party USA) (US)
 Young Religious Unitarian Universalists (US/Canada)
 Young Riflemen (Lithuania)
 Young Yatri Organization (Nepal)
 Youth 2000
 Youth Action Network (UK)
 Youth Activism Project (US)
 Youth Assisting Youth (US)
 Youth Association of Kuwait (Kuwait)
 Youth for Christ (US)
 Youth Climate Movement  (US)
 Youth Conservation Corps (US)
 Youth for Human Rights International
 Young Labour (UK)
 Youth Leaders International
 Youth Liberation of Ann Arbor
 Youth Link Movement (Sri Lanka)
 Youth Organisation Freedom and Democracy (Netherlands)
 Youth Parliament of Manitoba (Canada)
 Youth Parliament Program (India)
 Youth Parliament of Pakistan (Pakistan)
 Youth Radio (US)
 AER Youth Regional Network (Europe)
 Young Republicans (US)
 Young Scientists of Australia (AUS)
 Youth Service America
 Youth United (India)
 Yuva Unstoppable (India)
 YMCA (Young Men's Christian Association)
 YWCA (Young Women's Christian Association)
 YMCA Youth and Government (US)
 YMCA Youth Parliament (AUS)

See also 
 List of youth empowerment organizations
 List of youth topics
 Youth-led media
 Youth empowerment

References

Youth empowerment organizations
Youth model government
Youth organizations
Youth organizations by country
Jewish youth organizations
 
Youth Organizations